John Percival Slim (9 January 1885 – 14 March 1966) was a British wrestler who competed in the 1908 Summer Olympics. In 1908, at the 1908 Summer Olympics, he won the silver medal in the freestyle wrestling featherweight class.

References

External links
John Slim's profile at Sports Reference.com

1885 births
1966 deaths
Olympic wrestlers of Great Britain
Wrestlers at the 1908 Summer Olympics
British male sport wrestlers
Olympic silver medallists for Great Britain
Olympic medalists in wrestling
Medalists at the 1908 Summer Olympics